St. Louisville is a village in Licking County, Ohio, United States, along the North Fork of the Licking River. The population was 373 at the 2010 census.

St. Louisville was platted in 1839.

Geography
St. Louisville is located at  (40.172821, -82.418787).

Demographics

2010 census
As of the census of 2010, there were 373 people, 143 households, and 103 families living in the village. The racial makeup of the village was 97.3% White, 0.3% African American, 1.1% Native American, 0.8% from other races, and 0.5% from two or more races. Hispanic or Latino of any race were 0.8% of the population.

There were 143 households, of which 38.5% had children under the age of 18 living with them, 49.0% were married couples living together, 14.7% had a female householder with no husband present, 8.4% had a male householder with no wife present, and 28.0% were non-families. 23.1% of all households were made up of individuals, and 13.3% had someone living alone who was 65 years of age or older. The average household size was 2.61 and the average family size was 3.05.

The median age in the village was 36.1 years. 29% of residents were under the age of 18; 7.7% were between the ages of 18 and 24; 23.5% were from 25 to 44; 23.6% were from 45 to 64; and 16.1% were 65 years of age or older. The gender makeup of the village was 47.7% male and 52.3% female.

2000 census
As of the census of 2000, there were 346 people, 119 households, and 96 families living in the village. The population density was 1,402.0 people per square mile (534.4/km). There were 127 housing units at an average density of 514.6 per square mile (196.1/km). The racial makeup of the village was 98.55% White, 0.29% Native American, and 1.16% from two or more races.

There were 119 households, out of which 38.7% had children under the age of 18 living with them, 63.9% were married couples living together, 12.6% had a female householder with no husband present, and 19.3% were non-families. 16.0% of all households were made up of individuals, and 5.9% had someone living alone who was 65 years of age or older. The average household size was 2.91 and the average family size was 3.20.

In the village, the population was spread out, with 29.2% under the age of 18, 8.7% from 18 to 24, 28.0% from 25 to 44, 23.7% from 45 to 64, and 10.4% who were 65 years of age or older. The median age was 35 years. For every 100 females there were 98.9 males. For every 100 females age 18 and over, there were 97.6 males.

The median income for a household in the village was $42,250, and the median income for a family was $43,500. Males had a median income of $34,688 versus $25,469 for females. The per capita income for the village was $13,995. About 5.6% of families and 7.5% of the population were below the poverty line, including 5.7% of those under age 18 and 12.1% of those age 65 or over.

References

Villages in Licking County, Ohio
Villages in Ohio
1839 establishments in Ohio
Populated places established in 1839